Caeria (died 344/343 BC), was an Illyrian queen who reigned in the second part of the fourth century BC.

Cynane, an Illyrian princess and daughter of Philip II of Macedon, engaged in battle with Caeria in 344/343 BC. An account cites that Cynane accompanied her father when this happened during his campaign in Illyria. Caeria was killed by Cynane in a hand-to-hand combat with a blow to the throat, and with great slaughter, her army was also defeated.

See also 
 List of rulers of Illyria

References 

Illyrian queens
History of Macedonia (region)
Women in ancient Greek warfare
4th-century BC women rulers